Yolağzı is a village in the Silopi district of Şırnak Province in Turkey. The village is populated by Kurds of the Bersuva tribe and had a population of 41 in 2021.

References 

Villages in Silopi District
Kurdish settlements in Şırnak Province